Balestra is the surname of:

 Antonio Balestra (1666–1740), Italian painter of the Rococo period
 Giovanni Balestra (1774–1842), Italian engraver
 Pietro Balestra (economist) (1935–2005), Swiss economist
 Pietro Balestra (sculptor) (c. 1672–after 1729), Italian sculptor of the late Baroque period
 Renato Balestra (1924–2022), Italian fashion designer

Italian-language surnames